The 2017 Mississippi Valley State Delta Devils football team represented Mississippi Valley State University in the 2017 NCAA Division I FCS football season. The Delta Devils were led by fourth-year head coach, Rick Comegy and played their home games at Rice–Totten Stadium as members of the East Division of the Southwestern Athletic Conference (SWAC). The Delta Devils finished the season 2–9, 1–6 in SWAC play to finish in last place in the East Division.

On November 20, it was announced that head coach Rick Comegy's contract would not be renewed. He finished at Mississippi Valley State with a four-year record of 6–38.

Schedule

References

Mississippi Valley State
Mississippi Valley State Delta Devils football seasons
Mississippi Valley State Delta Devils football